is a twelve-volume manga series created by manga artist Kia Asamiya. Both anime versions have been licensed by Bandai Entertainment. It is heavily influenced by the film Blade Runner and is centered on the lives of a dedicated group of all-female police officers with protecting Tokyo from an invasion of extra-dimensional creatures called Lucifer Hawks.

The series has been adapted into animation twice, once as a pair of films and again as a 26-episode television series.

A new manga series, titled Silent Möbius QD, started in 2013 and serves as a sequel to the original series.

Plot
In 1999, Gigelf Liqueur, aided by the Magician's Guild, set into motion a plan to open a gate between Earth and the world of Nemesis. The intent was to exchange Earth's polluted air and water with clean air and water from Nemesis. To aid in this endeavor, a huge cyclotron was built under Tokyo. However, Ganossa Maximilian, Gigelf's old apprentice, sabotaged the plan by opening the gate early and perverting the gate for his own means. For a number of years following this event, Gigelf and the Magician's Guild battled an invasion of Lucifer Hawk, their name for the inhabitants of Nemesis. Gigelf was killed in 2006 and it appeared the rest of the Guild met with similar fates over the next few years.

In 2023, Rally Cheyenne felt partially responsible for the growing attacks on innocent humans by marauding creatures from Nemesis. She is of mixed heritage because her mother Lufa Cheyenne was a Magician's Guild member but her father was from Nemesis. Rally started the organization called the Attacked Mystification Police (AMP), with only three officers (Kiddy Phenil, Lebia Maverick and Nami Yamigumo) and a sub-commander (Mana Isozaki). Over the next few years, she added Yuki Saiko, Katsumi Liqueur and Lum Cheng to the team, all aiding in the fight to protect Earth from the vicious Lucifer Hawk.

Characters

Attacked Mystification Police Department
The Attacked Mystification Police Department (AMP) is a branch of the Tokyo police force formed specifically to fight the Lucifer Hawk and have the powerful pursuit aircraft the Simurgh at their disposal.

; Marcy Goldberg (English)
Rally is the founder and chief of the AMP. She is quite powerful because she is half-human and half-Lucifer Hawk.

; Caroline Savenkoff (English)
Mana is the Section Chief of the AMP who joined in 2028 and is a powerful sorceress.

; Nicole Oliver (English)
Katsumi was recruited into the AMP to become their main weapon against the Lucifer Hawk of Nemesis.

; Ellen Kennedy (English)
The AMP's second in command.

; Lisa Ann Beley (English)
Kiddy is a former special detective who is part cyborg. She is physically the strongest in AMP. She presents a gruff exterior and acts manly and mean, however she is a caring person and falls in love with Ralph Bomers.

; Nicole Amos (English)
A Shinto priestess.

; Kelly Sheridan (English)
Yuki is a young psychic. She is a keen cook and runs her own cafe.

; Nicole Oliver (English)
Lum originates from Neo Clone in Hong Kong. Still young, Lum can be immature and act rashly during battle, however her naivete helps bind the AMP members.

; Don Brown (English)
Grosspoliner is also known as The Sword Emperor or the King of Swords which once belonged to Gigelf Liqueur. It has the ability to speak and change form, and folds into a skull-like shape when not active. It was locked away in an obelisk for 22 years and after it was freed by Katsumi Liqueur, it bonded itself to her. Grospolina is also known as The Sword Emperor or the King of Swords.

Other characters

; Barry Levy (English)
Robert, also called Roy, is a Tokyo Police officer and becomes Katsumi's boyfriend. He and the other members of his squad were injected with small amounts of Dommel to increase their physical strength and reflexes. He is killed by Ganossa and his death drives Katsumi's conversion to evil.

; Paul Dobson (English)
Ralph is a Tokyo Police officer in the Special Investigations Squad. Ralph was the officer investigating the Creature Trap and also the officer charged with bringing in Wire. He initially argues with Kiddy, but eventually falls in love with her.

; Jenn Forgie (English)
Rosa is Rally's younger sister and possesses similar abilities to Rally, but less powerful. Under Ganossa's influence, Rosa left for Nemesis and returned to try and destroy Rally. She appears to die and is released from her bondage after battling with her sister.

; Trevor Devall (English)
Maximilian Ganossa was involved in Project Gaia with Gigelf. Nemesis made him immortal and provided him with great power.

;  (English)
Generic term for the more powerful types of Lucifer Folk from Nemesis, an Extra-dimensional world which is home to Lucifer Folk. Humans have categorized them into three different types based on their capabilities: Category 3 are most common but low intelligence; Category 2 have some intelligence and can communicate through speech; Category 1 have status in Nemesis, can communicate through speech and are capable of independent thought.

Manga
The manga series started in 1989 and was published in the magazine Comic Dragon. It ended in 1999 after 12 volumes. In 2013, Asamiya began a new Silent Möbius series, titled Silent Möbius QD, which takes place 17 years after the original story. The manga finished on June 20, 2018.

It is published in English by Udon Entertainment; previously it was published in English by Viz Media.

Adaptations

Films
Between 1991 and 1992, two animated film adaptions were produced by AIC. Part 1 was directed by Kazuo Tomizawa, and written by Kei Shigema. Part 2 was directed by Yasunori Ide and written by Manabu Nakamura. Kaoru Wada produced the scores for both series. Both films have been compiled into a single version in some releases.

TV series
In 1998, a 26-episode animated TV series was produced by animation studio Radix. Hideki Tonokatsu served as director, while Hiroyuki Kawasaki served as writer. American composer Jimmie Haskell produced the score for the series. A second season was planned but it was canceled due to low ratings and sales of the first season.

Stage plays
Kia Asamiya announced that on Saturday, December 17, 2016, the stage play adaptation of Silent Möbius has been greenlit. The main staff and the main casts were revealed following December 23, as well as the run date from March 29 to April 2, 2017. The cast includes Karen Iwata, Saori Yasaka, Mutsuki Arisawa, Saki Suzuki, Rin Asuka, Mayu Sekiya, Emi Ōtori and Saki Funaoka.

Notes

Works cited

References

Further reading 
 
 
 
 Silent Möbius (anime) at CAR (episode reviews and story analysis, including comparison between manga and anime)
 Animerica review
 Bandai official website

External links
 

1991 anime films
1991 manga
1992 anime films
1998 anime television series debuts
Fiction set in 2023
Anime International Company
Bandai Entertainment anime titles
Bandai Visual
Dengeki Comics
Fujimi Shobo manga
Gangan Comics manga
Kia Asamiya
Kodansha manga
Science fiction anime and manga
Shōnen manga
TV Tokyo original programming
Viz Media manga